Lawrence Edgar Low (August 22, 1920 – July 1, 1996) was an American sailor and Olympic champion. He competed at the 1956 Summer Olympics in Melbourne, where he received a gold medal in the star class with the boat Kathleen, together with Herbert Williams.

Born in Trenton, New Jersey, Low was raised in the Green Pond section of Rockaway Township, New Jersey.

References

External links
 
 
 

1920 births
1996 deaths
American male sailors (sport)
Sailors at the 1956 Summer Olympics – Star
Olympic gold medalists for the United States in sailing
Medalists at the 1956 Summer Olympics
People from Rockaway Township, New Jersey
Sportspeople from Morris County, New Jersey
Sportspeople from Trenton, New Jersey